Sust (also Romanized as Sūst and Sūset) is a village in Khotbeh Sara Rural District, Kargan Rud District, Talesh County, Gilan Province, Iran. At the 2006 census, its population was 373, in 100 families.

References 

Populated places in Talesh County